This a list of notable schools in the African country of Liberia.

Primary and secondary schools (by county)

Margibi County 
Booker Washington Institute, Kakata, established 1929
Mid-Liberia Christian School System, Nursery - Elem & Jr. High, Ben's Town Marshall, Liberia
Kakata Community College, Kakata City http://campus.midlibcssedu.org
Gbotee R.Peabody Foundation,
Day-care, Nursery and Elementary Sch.,
Transit Community, Duazon, Margibi County,RIA Road, Liberia.

Post-secondary institutions

 African Methodist Episcopal University, Montserrado County
 Starz University, Montserrado County
 Booker Washington Institute, Kakata
 Cuttington University, Bong County
 Louis Arthur Grimes School of Law, Montserrado County
 Stella Maris Polytechnic, Montserrado County
 Tubman University, Maryland County
 United Methodist University, Montserrado County
 University of Liberia, Montserrado County
 Adventist University of West Africa, Margibi County
 Nimba County University College, Nimba County
 African Methodist Episcopal Zion University, Montserrado County

See also

 Education in Liberia
 CENSIL University College

References

Liberia education-related lists
Lists of buildings and structures in Liberia
Lists of organizations based in Liberia
Liberia
Liberia